Faith Yang Naiwen (born 2 March 1974) is a Taiwanese musician. She grew up in Sydney, Australia and studied biology and genetics at the University of Sydney. In 2000, Yang won the Golden Melody Award for Best Female Mandarin Singer for the album Silence.

Life and career
After graduating from Sydney University, Yang returned to Taiwan to start a music career. She soon gained recognition at the university and pub circuit in Taiwan while touring with her backing band - Monster. In 1996 she signed with Magicstone records. Her first two albums are heavily influenced by the Australian pub rock style, with a gothic undertone noticeable in tracks such as "Silence", "Fear" and "Monster", while her third album has a lighter pop style, with only hints of the anger evident in the first two recordings. All three albums were major hits in Taiwan and in 2000 Faith won the Taiwan Golden Music awards for Best Female Performer got nominated for Best Album (Silence).

Yang did not renew her contract with Magicstone, claiming the label had become too commercial for her style of music. In 2004 it was reported that she had signed with Sony label Silver Fish Records. Her first album with Silver Fish Records, Continuation (女爵), was released December 2007, with Self-Selected, an album of English-language covers, released in April 2009.

Yang also works as a fashion and cosmetics model for companies such as Rado and Neutrogena, as well as continuing to tour on the Taiwan pub circuit. She has also considered a number of acting roles. In 2000 Yang played the lead role in the 20-part web movie 175 Degrees of Colour Blindness (175度色盲).

Discography

References

External links 
 Official site
 
 Faith Yang's Chinese lyrics and English Translation from amw168.com

1974 births
Living people
Taiwanese female models
Taiwanese Mandopop singers
Women rock singers
University of Sydney alumni
Musicians from Taipei
21st-century Taiwanese women singers
21st-century Taiwanese singers
Australian people of Chinese descent
Australian people of Taiwanese descent